Pararhenanoperca is an extinct genus of prehistoric bony fish that lived during the middle division of the Eocene epoch.

See also

 Prehistoric fish
 List of prehistoric bony fish

References

Prehistoric perciform genera
Eocene fish